Heather Claire Roffey (born September 30, 1986) is a Caymanian former swimmer, who specialized in long-distance freestyle and butterfly events. She became one of the first swimmers, and the first female, in history to represent the Cayman Islands in swimming at the Summer Olympics at the 2004 Summer Olympics in Athens, along with Shaune Fraser and Andrew Mackay.

At her first Olympics, Roffey qualified for two swimming events with three days in between. She posted FINA B-standard entry times of 9:01.41 (800 m freestyle) and 2:17.70 (200 m butterfly) from the Ultra Swim Meet in Charlotte, North Carolina. In the 200 m butterfly, Roffey challenged seven other swimmers on the first heat, including 15-year-old Maria Bulakhova of Russia. She cleared a 2:20 barrier to clinch a fifth spot and thirtieth overall in 2:19.34, just nearly two seconds off her entry time. In her second event, 800 m freestyle, Kwon placed twenty-fifth overall on the morning's preliminaries. Swimming again in heat one, she raced to fourth place by a 3.07-second margin behind winner Golda Marcus of El Salvador with a time of 9:02.88.

Roffey is also a member of Bolles School Swim Club in Jacksonville, Florida, and a varsity swimmer for the South Carolina Gamecocks, under her respective coaches Jeff Poppell and Donald Gibb. In 2007, she graduated from the University of South Carolina in Columbia, with a bachelor's degree in accounting.

References

External links
 
 Player Bio – South Carolina Gamecocks
 Cayman Islands Olympic Profile: Heather Roffey

1986 births
Living people
Caymanian female swimmers
Pan American Games competitors for the Cayman Islands
Olympic swimmers of the Cayman Islands
Swimmers at the 2004 Summer Olympics
Swimmers at the 2003 Pan American Games
Caymanian female freestyle swimmers
Female butterfly swimmers
South Carolina Gamecocks women's swimmers
University of South Carolina alumni
Central American and Caribbean Games gold medalists for the Cayman Islands
Central American and Caribbean Games medalists in swimming
Competitors at the 2002 Central American and Caribbean Games